Turtle Creek is a creek that rises west of Blessing, Texas (USA) in western Matagorda County.  It runs 12.5 miles (20 km) southwest to Turtle Bay, west of Palacios.

See also
List of rivers of Texas

References

External links 

Rivers of Matagorda County, Texas
Rivers of Texas